Joseph Louis "Jules" Verlet (16 August 1883 – 22 July 1924) was a French footballer. He competed in the men's tournament at the 1908 Summer Olympics held in London, England.

References

External links
 

1883 births
1924 deaths
French footballers
France international footballers
Olympic footballers of France
Footballers at the 1908 Summer Olympics
People from Asnières-sur-Seine
Association football defenders
Footballers from Hauts-de-Seine
CA Paris-Charenton players
France B international footballers